Alex Shumway (born December 14, 1965), known professionally as Alex Vincent, is an American musician, songwriter, and actor who is best known as the drummer for the rock band Green River. Along with Mark Arm, Steve Turner, and Jeff Ament, he is one of its founding members. He is also the founder, drummer, and songwriter for the band Ex's With Benefits; as well as a founder and guitar player for the band Thee Deception.

Biography 

Vincent attended the Northwest School in Seattle, Washington with future bandmates Steve Turner and Stone Gossard (as well as future Presidents of the United States of America drummer, Jason Finn). He was the drummer for the band Spluii Numa and later pioneered the grunge scene as a founding member of Green River.

After the disbanding of Green River in 1988, he returned to college, eventually ending up in Japan as a student of international studies at Sophia University (上智大学) in Tokyo. He moved back to the United States in 1995 to work in politics and labor union-related organizations.

In 2012, he formed the punk band Ex's With Benefits with Dmitra Smith, Dave Place, and Pascal Faivre. In 2016, he formed Thee Deception with Dave Place, Samuel Bligh, Regan Hagar, and Cody Davis.

Green River 

Vincent and Turner became acquainted with fellow Seattle musician Mark Arm while playing shows in and around Seattle in the early 1980s. In mid-1984, the three decided to form a band. They snapped up local bassist Jeff Ament after his band at the time, Deranged Diction, had broken up. The foursome called themselves Green River. Stone Gossard joined shortly thereafter. "We knew we wanted Ament," said Vincent. "Stone was in another band with Jonathan Evison called March of Crimes. [Stone] got fired from them and we picked him up just before we recorded the first demo." By the time the band finished the recording of its debut EP, Come on Down, Turner decided to leave the group, citing his distaste with Ament and Gossard's heavy metal leanings. Bruce Fairweather, Ament's former Deranged Diction bandmate, replaced Turner.

The band released the EP Come on Down in 1985 and followed it up with Dry As a Bone in 1987, the first release on Sub Pop records. The band's only full-length studio album, Rehab Doll, was released in 1988. In-fighting within the band lead to the group's break-up during the recording of Rehab Doll. A stylistic division had developed between Ament and Gossard on one side, and Arm on the other. Ament and Gossard wanted to pursue a major-label deal, while Arm wanted to remain independent, viewing the duo as being too careerist. The band achieved a considerable local reputation in Seattle and had a significant influence on the genre later known as grunge, with Green River being described as "arguably the first grunge band."

In 2008, Green River reunited for the 20-year anniversary of the Sub Pop record label and have played several live shows since.

Ex's With Benefits 

Ex's With Benefits formed in 2012 after Vincent had written music for possible future recordings by Green River that never materialized. Not wanting the music to go to waste, he held on to it hoping to hear what it sounded like with vocals. He reconnected with an old high school friend, Dmitra Smith (who was fronting the San Francisco-based band Static People), sending her some of the songs to see if she'd be able to record on top of them. Almost immediately, it became a real collaboration. Soon after, Dmitra's husband, Pascal Faivre, joined on guitar with Dave Place on bass.

Big in Japan 

In October 2010, Vincent played himself in the semi-documentary film, Big in Japan, directed by John Jeffcoat. It premiered in March 2014 at the South By Southwest Music and Film Festival.

Personal life

Vincent currently lives in Seattle, Washington. Today, he is a stay-at-home father to his adopted daughters. He continues to compose and play music.

Discography

Green River discography

Ex's With Benefits discography

Thee Deception discography

References

Grunge musicians
American rock drummers
Green River (band) members
Living people
1965 births